Zaouiat Bougrine is a town in Sefrou Province, Fès-Meknès, Morocco. According to the 2004 census it has a population of 3,570.

References

Populated places in Sefrou Province